Adeuomphalus ammoniformis is a species of sea snail, a marine gastropod mollusc unassigned to family in the superfamily Seguenzioidea.

Description
The shell grows to a height of 2 mm.

Distribution
This species occurs in the Mediterranean Sea.

References

External links
 

ammoniformis
Gastropods described in 1876